Xeromphalina cauticinalis is a species of agaric fungus in the family Mycenaceae. Originally described in 1838 by Elias Fries as Marasmius cauticinalis, it was transferred to the genus Xeromphalina by Robert Kühner and René Maire in 1934. It is found in North America, where it fruits in the summer and autumn singly or in groups on the seeds, needles, and sticks of conifers, and sometimes on aspen leaves. The pale yellow gills have a decurrent attachment to the stipe and are somewhat distantly spaced. The spore print is white, while individual spores are elliptical, smooth, amyloid, and measure 4–7 by 2.5–3.5 µm.

The species is regarded as nonpoisonous.

References

External links

Fungi described in 1838
Fungi of North America
Mycenaceae